Fall Creek Township is one of fourteen townships in Madison County, Indiana, United States. As of the 2010 census, its population was 14,695 and it contained 4,570 housing units.

It was named from its principal stream and waterfalls.

History
The Fall Creek Meeting House was listed in the National Register of Historic Places in 1997.

Geography

Cities, towns, villages
 Anderson (southwest edge)
 Pendleton (vast majority)

Unincorporated towns
 Huntsville at 
 Idlewold at 
(This list is based on USGS data and may include former settlements.)

Cemeteries
The township contains these four cemeteries: Anderson Memorial Park, Bunker, Crosley and Grovelawn.

Major highways
  Interstate 69
  U.S. Route 36
  State Road 9
  State Road 38
  State Road 67

Airports and landing strips
 Harless Airport
 Huntzinger Airport

Prisons 
Three facilities of the Indiana Department of Corrections are in Fall Creek Township
Pendleton Correctional Facility
Correctional Industrial Facility
Pendleton Juvenile Correctional Facility

Education
 South Madison Community School Corporation

Fall Creek Township residents may obtain a free library card from the Pendleton Community Public Library in Pendleton.

Political districts
 Indiana's 6th congressional district
 State House District 37
 State Senate District 25

References
 
 United States Census Bureau 2008 TIGER/Line Shapefiles
 IndianaMap

External links

 Indiana Township Association
 United Township Association of Indiana
 City-Data.com page for Fall Creek Township
Fall Creek Township History

Townships in Madison County, Indiana
Townships in Indiana